Ron Barrier is the former national spokesperson and media coordinator of American Atheists, and he frequently appears in U.S. media to present arguments from an atheist perspective. He has debated Christian apologist William Lane Craig over the existence of God.

Barrier produces the cable TV program "The Atheist Viewpoint" in Staten Island, New York.

References

Year of birth missing (living people)
Living people
American atheism activists
Television producers from New York City
American television talk show hosts
21st-century atheists